15th Field Artillery Regiment can refer to:
15th Field Artillery Regiment (Canada)
15th Field Artillery Regiment (United States)